The Central Ferry Piers (Chinese: 中環碼頭) are situated on the northeast part of Central, Hong Kong Island. The ferries mostly depart to Outlying Islands in the New Territories, with the exception of Pier 1 serving as a government pier, and ferries from piers 7 and 8 going to Kowloon.

History
The current piers were all built in the 1990s and early 2000s due to the Airport Core Programme, under which the Central Reclamation was built to provide land for Hong Kong station, the terminus of the new airport railway. The previous piers had to be demolished to make way for the newly reclaimed land. The first set of new piers opened on 9 May 1995.

Ferry services
The destinations or uses of the piers are as follows:
Pier 1: Government of Hong Kong
Pier 2: Park Island
Pier 3: Discovery Bay
Pier 4: Lamma Island, with the western pier going to Sok Kwu Wan and the eastern pier to Yung Shue Wan.
Pier 5: Cheung Chau
Pier 6: Western pier: Peng Chau – Eastern pier: Mui Wo
Pier 7: Star Ferry service to Tsim Sha Tsui
Pier 8: Hong Kong Maritime Museum and Fortune Ferry service to Hung Hom
Pier 9: Public Pier
Pier 10: Public Pier

Star Ferry Pier, Central is a "movable name", which now refers to the "fourth generation" Star Ferry pier, aka Pier 7 in Central.

Former piers
 Blake Pier, demolished 1993
 Edinburgh Place Ferry Pier – "third generation" Star Ferry pier, abandoned in November 2006, demolition completed early 2007
 Queen's Pier, Edinburgh Place, was completely demolished in February 2008
 United Pier, also known as Jubilee Pier, demolished 1994

See also
 Outlying Islands Ferry Pier

References

External links
 

Central, Hong Kong
Piers in Hong Kong
Victoria Harbour